The House of Dun is a National Trust for Scotland property in the parish of Dun, lying close to the edge of Montrose Basin and situated approximately half way between the towns of Montrose and Brechin, in Angus, Scotland.

The Dun Estate was home to the Erskine (later Kennedy-Erskine) family from 1375 until 1980. John Erskine of Dun was a key figure in the Scottish Reformation. The current house was designed by William Adam and was finished in 1743. (Work had commenced in 1732.) There is elaborate plaster-work by Joseph Enzer, principally and most elaborately in the saloon. The house replaced the original 14th Century Tower House to the west when David Erskine, Lord Dun, the 13th Laird of Dun, an Edinburgh lawyer appointed Lord of Justiciary in 1710, wanted a more comfortable and prestigious home. He opposed the union. It continued as the home to the Erskines for a further 250 years, undergoing some internal re-modeling when Lady Augusta Fitzclarence, natural daughter to William IV (previously the Duke of Clarence) and his long term mistress, Dora Jordan, married the Honourable John Kennedy Erskine, heir to the property through his mother Margaret Erskine of Dun. When they married they moved to the property and Augusta set about making several alterations, modernizing the property. The writer and poet Violet Jacob (1863 - 1946), author of "Flemington" and "Tales of Angus", was a member of the Kennedy-Erskine family and was born in the house. The last Laird of Dun was Mrs. Millicent Lovett. She moved out of the house to an estate house "temporarily" in 1948, moving all the furnishings and artifacts up into the attic. The rest of the house was leased to a local farming family who ran it as a bed and breakfast establishment for many years. Millicent never returned to the house and on her death in 1980 it was bequeathed by her to the National Trust for Scotland. The Trust discovered all the original furnishings in the attic and spent 9 years returning the house to the state it had been in at the time of Augusta. In 1989, the house opened to the public, the Queen Mother presiding to mark the tercentenary of William Adam's death.

The adjacent Montrose Basin nature reserve, part of the estuary of the South Esk, is also a National Trust for Scotland property.

Archaeology
The proximate area evinces archaeological evidence of early man dating back 9,000 years. Besides finds at the House of Dun property itself, there is a large standing stone a few miles to the north known as the Stone of Morphie.

Notable people
 John Erskine of Dun (1509 – 1591), Laird of Dun, Scottish religious reformer.
 David Erskine, Lord Dun (1670 – 1758), 13th Laird of Dun, Scottish advocate, judge and commissioner to the Scottish parliament. Commissioned William Adam to build House of Dun. Opposed the Union.
 Margaret Erskine of Dun (1772 – 1848).
 Lady Augusta Gordon (1803 – 1865), née FitzClarence, fourth illegitimate daughter of William IV and mother of Wilhelmina FitzClarence, Countess of Munster. 
 Wilhelmina FitzClarence, Countess of Munster (1830 – 1906), née Kennedy-Erskine, novelist. 
 Violet Jacob (1863 – 1946), Scottish writer & poet, known especially for her historical novel Flemington.

See also
 Clan Erskine
 Dun, Angus

References

External links
House of Dun & Montrose Basin Nature Reserve on National Trust for Scotland website

National Trust for Scotland properties
Country houses in Angus, Scotland
William Adam buildings
Category A listed buildings in Angus, Scotland
Inventory of Gardens and Designed Landscapes
Gardens in Angus, Scotland
History of Angus, Scotland
Historic house museums in Angus, Scotland